Finalmente ho conosciuto il conte Dracula... an album by Italian singer Mina, released in 1985. This is a double album issued as "CD. 1" and "CD. 2 ".

The Album 
This is the first double album by Mina to be released on both vinyl and compact disc simultaneously. 
Questione di feeling is a duet with Riccardo Cocciante and was the theme song of the TV show Pentatlon with Mike Bongiorno. The song was also later recorded by Mina in 2007 in Spanish as a duet with Tiziano Ferro for the album Todavía.
Eppur mi son scordato di te was first sung live as part of a medley with Lucio Battisti in 1972 for the show Teatro 10.

CD. 1

CD. 2

References

1985 albums
Mina (Italian singer) albums